The Fluchthorn is a mountain of the Swiss Pennine Alps, located south of Saas-Almagell in the canton of Valais. It lies east of the Strahlhorn.

References

External links
 Fluchthorn on Hikr

Mountains of the Alps
Alpine three-thousanders
Mountains of Switzerland
Mountains of Valais